Charles Augustin Baron Liedts (2 December 1802 in Oudenaarde – 21 March 1878) was a Belgian liberal politician.

Born into the Bourgeoisie of Oudenaarde he became only 28 years young member of the National Congress of Belgium. After he became governor of Antwerp.

He was President of the Belgian Chamber of Representatives from 17 November 1843 until 20 May 1848. By royal Command he was created Baron Liedts by King Leopold II. He was Minister of Finance from 1852 to 1855.

He was married to Lady Rose de Haen 1815–1876.

Honours 
 1847: Minister of state, by Royal Decree.
 1870: Created Baron Liedts, by Royal Decree.
 Grand Cordon of the Order of Leopold.
 1ste Class in the Order of the Red Eagle.
 Knight Grand Cross in the Order of the Netherlands Lion.
 Knight Grand Cross in the Order of the Iron Crown.
 Grand Officer in the Legion of Honour.
 Grand Officer in the Saxe-Ernestine House Order.

See also
 Liberal Party
 Liberalism in Belgium

References

Sources
 Charles Liedts (Dutch)

1802 births
1878 deaths
Belgian Ministers of State
Finance ministers of Belgium
Governors of Hainaut (province)
Free University of Brussels (1834–1969) alumni
Members of the National Congress of Belgium
People from Oudenaarde
Presidents of the Chamber of Representatives (Belgium)
Grand Officiers of the Légion d'honneur